Route 19 is a  north–south state highway located in south central Massachusetts, United States. It runs from the Connecticut border in Wales north to an intersection with Massachusetts Route 9 and Massachusetts Route 67 in the town of West Brookfield.

The highway continues south of the state border as Connecticut Route 19.

Route description

Route 19 in Massachusetts begins when Route 19 in Connecticut crosses from Stafford, Connecticut, into Wales, Massachusetts. The highway meanders through the town and continues north into Brimfield, where it crosses U.S. Route 20 in the center of town. Route 19 continues north out of the town and heads due north, eventually crossing into the town of Warren in Worcester County. Just after crossing into Warren, Route 19 passes underneath the Massachusetts Turnpike (I-90) without an interchange. (The nearest interchanges are at Exit 8 in Palmer and Exit 9 in Sturbridge, both accessible from US-20.) Route 19 heads into the center of town where it meets Route 67. Route 19 joins Route 67 northbound, and the two routes run concurrently northeast until crossing into West Brookfield, where they intersect with Route 9. Route 19 ends here, with Route 67 turning to join Route 9 eastbound.

History

From Brimfield south to the Connecticut state line, Route 19 was part of New England Interstate Route 32.

Major intersections

References

Neilbert.com Massachusetts Route Log

019
Transportation in Hampden County, Massachusetts
Transportation in Worcester County, Massachusetts